Cork tree or corktree may refer to:
 Cork oak, Quercus suber, the tree from which most cork is harvested
 Chinese cork oak, Quercus variabilis, a tree from which cork is occasionally harvested
 Cork-tree, a species of Phellodendron
Euonymus phellomanus, a large deciduous shrub with corky “wings”
 Indian cork tree, Millingtonia hortensis
 From Under The Cork Tree, a 2005 album by Fall Out Boy